Bartłomiej Bis (born 25 March 1997) is a Polish handball player for Górnik Zabrze and the Polish national team.

References

1997 births
Living people
Sportspeople from Kielce
Polish male handball players
Vive Kielce players
21st-century Polish people